The Federal Government Commissioner for the Acceptance of Sexual and Gender Diversity (known as Commissioner for LGBTIQ+ Equality for short and informally nicknamed the "Queer Commissioner") is an office in the federal Government of Germany that is tasked with promoting and defending LGBTIQ+ rights and fighting anti-LGBTIQ+ hate.

The office was created by the coalition government of Chancellor Olaf Scholz in 2021. The inaugural holder of the office is Alliance 90/The Greens politician Sven Lehmann, who concurrently holds the office of Parliamentary State Secretary in the Federal Ministry of Family Affairs, Senior Citizens, Women and Youth. In November 2022 the federal cabinet adopted a new strategy to promote LGBTIQ+ rights and combat anti-LGBTIQ+ hate.

References

Government of Germany
LGBT politics